The Horsefair flats are a complex of medium and high rise maisonettes and flats in Pontefract, West Yorkshire, England.  The scheme was approved in 1956 and designed by John Poulson.  The blocks were refurbished in 1999.

Layout
The complex lies between Horsefair and Southgate.  Luke Williams House forms the central block and can be accessed from Horsefair via the Horsefair Precinct which has a small number of shops within.  At eight storeys high George Wright House is the second tallest block and is situated between Luke Williams House and Southgate.  There are eleven blocks in total compromising flats and maisonettes; mostly deck access.  Luke Williams House has a community room.  There is a small precinct connecting the complex with Horsefair, this contains four retail unites; presently these are one cafe, a community kitchen, an off-licence and a vacant shop.

Today

The complex is largely unchanged since refurbishment in 1999.  Ownership of the complex has since been transferred to WDH.  The housing association have since ceased to issue new lets in Lewis Walsh House with many maisonettes now vacant.

Other
Luke Williams House is used for high-rise fire training by West Yorkshire Fire and Rescue Service.

Gallery

External links
 WDH

References

Pontefract
John Poulson buildings